William Markley (Mark) Bellamy (born August 31, 1950) is an American diplomat. A career Foreign Service Officer, he served as United States ambassador to Kenya from 2003 to 2006 under President George W. Bush.

Early life and education 
Bellamy was born in Okmulgee, Oklahoma, in 1950. He earned a BA from Occidental College and an MA from Tufts University Fletcher School of Law and Diplomacy.

Career

Ambassador to Kenya

In his role as United States Ambassador to Kenya, Bellamy led international efforts to handle the AIDS crisis and combat corruption. In August 2004, Bellamy opened a community-owned tourist lodge named Lion's Bluff in the LUMO Community Wildlife Sanctuary. In January 2006, Bellamy was involved in rescue efforts following the collapse of a building on Nairobi's Ngala Street that killed four people.

Later career 
After being Ambassador to Kenya, Bellamy was senior vice president of the National Defense University. Bellamy later retired from diplomacy in 2007. He now advises the Center for Strategic and International Studies and is a professor at Simmons University. In October 2019, Bellamy was a signatory to a letter by national security officials demanding protection for the anonymous whistleblower that sparked the impeachment inquiry against Donald Trump.

References

1950 births
Living people
Ambassadors of the United States to Kenya
Occidental College alumni
The Fletcher School at Tufts University alumni